Major General Rupert Gordon Lochner  (26 January 1891 – 1965) was an officer in the British Army.

World War I
He was Commissioned 5 October 1910 in the South Wales Borderers from the Royal Military College, Sandhurst, and saw service during World War I in France and Belgium from July 1915 to July 1916, and again from January 1917 to November 1918, earning the Military Cross during this time.

World War II
He was appointed to command the 1st battalion, The South Wales Borderers as a Lieutenant-Colonel from 20 February 1938 to 14 October 1940. He was appointed acting Brigadier-General 15 October 1940.  As part of Paiforce (formerly Iraqforce), Lochner commanded the 18th Indian Brigade of the Indian 8th Infantry Division during the Anglo-Soviet invasion of Persia.

He relinquished command of the brigade 14 August 1942 and was promoted to acting Major-General 15 August 1942 and became the Base Commander Persia and Iraq from 15 August 1942 until 14 September 1942. He was advanced again to temporary Major-General 15 August 1943 until 10 December 1943 when he relinquished the rank but he was again appointed temporary Major-General 25 October 1944.  He was Mentioned in Despatches twice during World War II.

He retired a Colonel (Honorary Major-General) in January 1946.

Command history
 1938–1940 : Commanding Officer, 1st battalion, The South Wales Borderers 
 1940–1942: Commanding Officer, 18th Indian Brigade, Indian 8th Infantry Division 
 1942: Commanding Officer, Base, Persia and Iraq
 1942–1943: General Officer Commanding, Indian 2nd Infantry Division, Iraq

See also
 Iraqforce

References

Bibliography

External links
Generals of World War II

1891 births
1965 deaths
British Army generals of World War II
South Wales Borderers officers
Graduates of the Royal Military College, Sandhurst
British Army personnel of World War I
Recipients of the Military Cross
Deputy Lieutenants of Brecknockshire